Neufmanil is a commune in the Ardennes department in northern France.

Geography
Neufmanil is a commune in the Ardennes department in the north-east of Charleville-Mézières and 7 kilometers from the Belgian border. It is crossed by the Goutelle.

History
The first mention of the city dates back to the ninth century, when it became part of the Holy Roman Empire. Neufmanil returned to France in 1769. The city was occupied during World War I and World War II.

See also
Communes of the Ardennes department

References

Communes of Ardennes (department)
Ardennes communes articles needing translation from French Wikipedia